Jovana Crnogorac (born 29 February 1992 in Belgrade) is a Serbian cross-country mountain biker. She competes for Turkey team Salcano. She competed at the 2010 Youth Olympics in Singapore. At the 2014 Mountain Bike U23 World Championship she won 5th place and finished 5th in overall standings of the 2014 U23 UCI Mountain Bike World Cup.

Achievements
World U23 Championship:
5th place, Hafjell 2014
18th place, Pietermaritzburg 2013
14th place, Saalfelden 2012
European U23 Championship:
8th place, St. Wendel 2014
14th place, Bern 2013
15th place, Moscow 2012
World Cup:
3rd place - U23 Windham 2014
3rd place - U23 Cairns 2014
4th place - U23 Albstad 2014
6th place - U23 Pietermaritzburg 2014
13th place - U23 Hafjell 2013
9th place - U23 Andorra 2013
12th place - U23 Val di Sole 2013
European Games:
19th place, Baku 2015

References

External links
Jovana Crnogorac - Official site (defunct)

Serbian female cyclists
Cross-country mountain bikers
1992 births
Living people
Sportspeople from Belgrade
Cyclists at the 2010 Summer Youth Olympics
Cyclists at the 2015 European Games
European Games competitors for Serbia
Olympic cyclists of Serbia
Cyclists at the 2016 Summer Olympics